"The Clubfooted Grocer" by Sir Arthur Conan Doyle was first published in The Strand Magazine.

Plot
It is a nineteenth-century short story about a man who goes to help his wealthy uncle, once a grocer and trader of jewelry and expensive artifacts. The narrator doesn’t know why he is called to help his uncle until he arrives and finds that his uncle has a death threat from someone who wants something the uncle possesses.

External links
 Telling tales - Edxcel pages 19–34
 Arthur Conan Doyle Society

References

Short stories by Arthur Conan Doyle
1898 short stories
Works originally published in The Strand Magazine